Alexandre "Sacha" Horowitz (24 March 1904 – 1982) was a Belgian-born Dutch mechanical engineer and inventor.

Alexandre "Sacha" Horowitz was born in 1904 in Antwerp, (Belgium) to parents of East-European Jewish heritage, and lived from 1914 in The Netherlands until his death in 1982. He has 136 patents awarded to his name over a period of 50 years, covering a wide variety of products including prefab housing, farm machinery (e.g. Vicon, see below) and oil industry equipment. His most well-known invention, however, is the Philishave rotary electric razor.

From 1958 to 1974, he was the first professor of product design and Production engineering at the Eindhoven University of Technology. In 1980, Horowitz was elected Honorary Member of the American Society of Mechanical Engineers. He died in 1982 in Switzerland.

References 

Hans Schippers, Vader van de Philishave, Dutch periodical De Ingenieur nr. 3–16 February 2000, p. 49

External links  

Philishave collectors Club, see history
Picture of a Vicon rotary plough
Horowitz, Alexandre (Sacha) 1904 - 1982 at the Database Joods Biografisch Woordenboek

1904 births
1982 deaths
20th-century Dutch inventors
Dutch Jews
Dutch mechanical engineers
Dutch electrical engineers
Delft University of Technology alumni
Philips employees
Academic staff of the Eindhoven University of Technology
Engineers from Antwerp
20th-century Dutch engineers
Belgian emigrants to the Netherlands